Kate Shoemaker (born August 25, 1987) is an American Paralympic equestrian. She represented the United States at the 2020 Summer Paralympics.

Career
Shoemaker made her World Equestrian Games debut in 2018 and won a bronze medal in the individual para-dressage freestyle grade IV event. She again competed at the World Championships in 2022 where she won a silver medal in the individual para-dressage freestyle grade IV event, and a bronze medal in the team para-dressage event.

Shoemaker represented the United States at the 2020 Summer Paralympics and won a bronze medal in the team event, alongside Rebecca Hart and Roxanne Trunnell.

Personal life
Shoemaker suffers from white matter lesions from periventricular ischemia causing motor control dysfunction, muscle weakness, and spasms on the right side of her body. 

She is also an equine veterinarian and runs her own practice, Velocity Equine Sports Medicine, in Wellington, Florida.

References

External links 
 
 

1987 births
Living people
American female equestrians
American dressage riders
Equestrians at the 2020 Summer Paralympics
Medalists at the 2020 Summer Paralympics
Paralympic equestrians of the United States
Paralympic bronze medalists for the United States
Paralympic medalists in equestrian
People from Eagle, Idaho
21st-century American women